Fairchild Mansion is a historic home located at Oneonta in Otsego County, New York. It is a three-story brick building with a turret, gables, a pedimented entrance porch and a porte cochere in the Queen Anne style. The original house was built in 1867 and subsequently expanded and modernized in 1897 and 1915 by its owner, George W. Fairchild (1845-1924).  The home was taken over by Oneonta Masonic Lodge in 1929.

It was listed on the National Register of Historic Places in 1974.  It is located within the Oneonta Downtown Historic District established in 2003.

Gallery

References

Houses on the National Register of Historic Places in New York (state)
Queen Anne architecture in New York (state)
Houses completed in 1867
Houses in Otsego County, New York
National Register of Historic Places in Otsego County, New York
Individually listed contributing properties to historic districts on the National Register in New York (state)